Henry Ludington  (May 25, 1739 – January 24, 1817) was an American soldier in the American Revolutionary War. He aided the effort by providing spies and was associated with John Jay in a ring of spies.

Early life 

Ludington's father, William Ludington, was born in Branford, Connecticut, on September 6, 1702.  He married Mary Knowles in 1730.  Ludington was born in Branford on May 25, 1738 as the third of eight children. His older sisters were Submit and Mary, and Lydia, Samuel, Rebecca, Anne, and Stephen were younger than him. He went to school in Branford and received an education typical for colonial towns of the 18th century.

Military 
Ludington enlisted in the local military in September 1756, at the age of seventeen. He was with Captain Foote's company of the Second Connecticut Regiment. He re-enlisted on April 19, 1756, served under Colonel Andrew Ward at Crown Point, and was discharged on November 13, 1756. He was called back again for fifteen days of service for the relief of Fort William Henry in August 1757. He re-enlisted on April 14, 1759, for the campaign of the Second Connecticut Regiment under Colonel Nathan Whiting and was a member of David Baldwin's Third Company. He served in the French and Indian War from 1755 to 1760 and was in the Battle of Lake George where he witnessed the death of his uncle and cousin. He marched with the British and American troops to Canada and participated in the Battle of Quebec on September 13, 1759. He then proceeded from Boston to Branford, Connecticut, in the spring of 1760 and retired from the military. 

Ludington returned to civilian life and married his cousin Abigail on May 1, 1760. She was born on May 8, 1745, and was turning fifteen years old. They had twelve children, all born in Kent, New York, (then known as Philipse Upper Patent) and raised the family on a 229 acre farm.

Ludington was commissioned a lieutenant in the British Colonial Army by King George II in recognition of his service. He resigned at the enactment of the Duties in American Colonies Act in 1765. He  was affiliated with George Washington's intelligence in the American Revolutionary War; the military commander Nathaniel Sackett asked Ludington for help to furnish spies in Dutchess and Westchester Counties, New York, to gather information on British activities.

Ludington collaborated with Enoch Crosby, an American Revolutionary War soldier who worked in the same territory. A shoemaker by trade, while traveling for his trade Crosby was able to obtained critical information important to Washington. Ludington aided Crosby with the objective to get information to American patriots. He also helped other spies, among them Benajah Tubbs and John Jay.

Death and legacy 
Ludington died at the age of 78 on January 24, 1817 and was buried in the churchyard of the town's Presbyterian church. The grave is marked with a tombstone that has a short inscription:

His wife, Abigail, died at the age of 80 on August 3, 1825, and is buried beside him.

Ludington was the grandfather of Harrison Ludington, who was the 12th governor of Wisconsin. His daughter, Sybil Ludington, has received widespread recognition for her role in a horseback ride to alert her father's Minute Men troops to meet the British army. A 2015 report in The New England Quarterly says there is little evidence backing the story; whether the ride occurred has been questioned since at least 1956.

References

Sources

External links 

 Ludington Family Papers

1739 births
1817 deaths
People from Dutchess County, New York
People of the Province of New York
People of New York (state) in the American Revolution
Ludington family